Bennett Hill Farm is a historic home and farm complex located at New Scotland in Albany County, New York.  The original section of the main house was built in 1821 and is a three-by-two-bay, -story dwelling.  In the 1830s, a large Greek Revival style -story, three- by two-bay addition was completed.  Contributing farm buildings include the main barn (1797), animal barn (c. 1900), wagon shed (c. 1900), fruit barn (c. 1900), smoke house (c. 1810), and tenant house (c. 1890).

It was listed on the National Register of Historic Places in 2003.

References

Houses on the National Register of Historic Places in New York (state)
Greek Revival houses in New York (state)
Houses completed in 1821
Houses in Albany County, New York
National Register of Historic Places in Albany County, New York